Diego María de la Concepción Juan Nepomuceno Estanislao de la Rivera y Barrientos Acosta y Rodríguez, known as Diego Rivera (December 8, 1886 – November 24, 1957), was a prominent Mexican painter. His large frescoes helped establish the mural movement in Mexican and international art.

Between 1922 and 1953, Rivera painted murals in, among other places, Mexico City, Chapingo, and Cuernavaca, Mexico; and San Francisco, Detroit, and New York City, United States. In 1931, a retrospective exhibition of his works was held at the Museum of Modern Art in New York; this was before he completed his 27-mural series known as Detroit Industry Murals.

Rivera had four wives and numerous children, including at least one natural daughter. His first child and only son died at the age of two. His third wife was fellow Mexican artist Frida Kahlo, with whom he had a volatile relationship that continued until her death. His fourth and final wife was his agent.

Due to his importance in the country's art history, the government of Mexico declared Rivera's works as monumentos historicos. As of 2018, Rivera holds the record for highest price at auction for a work by a Latin American artist. The 1931 painting The Rivals, part of the record-setting Collection of Peggy Rockefeller and David Rockefeller, sold for US$9.76 million.

Personal life

Rivera was born on December 8, 1886, as one of twin boys in Guanajuato, Mexico, to María del Pilar Barrientos and Diego Rivera Acosta, a well-to-do couple. His twin brother Carlos died two years after they were born.

His mother María del Pilar Barrientos was said to have converso ancestry (Spanish ancestors who were forced to convert from Judaism to Catholicism in the 15th and 16th centuries). Rivera wrote in 1935: "My Jewishness is the dominant element in my life", despite never being raised practicing any Jewish faith, Rivera felt his Jewish ancestry informed his art and gave him "sympathy with the downtrodden masses". Diego was of Spanish, Amerindian, African, Italian, Jewish, Russian, and Portuguese descent.

Rivera began drawing at the age of three, a year after his twin brother died. When he was caught drawing on the walls of the house, his parents installed chalkboards and canvas on the walls to encourage him.

Marriages and families
After moving to Paris, Rivera met Angelina Beloff, an artist from the pre-Revolutionary Russian Empire. They married in 1911, and had a son, Diego (1916–1918), who died young. During this time, Rivera also had a relationship with painter Maria Vorobieff-Stebelska, who gave birth to a daughter named Marika Rivera in 1918 or 1919.

Rivera divorced Beloff and married Guadalupe Marín as his second wife in June 1922, after having returned to Mexico. They had two daughters together: Ruth and Guadalupe.

He was still married when he met art student Frida Kahlo in Mexico. They began a passionate affair and, after he divorced Marín, Rivera married Kahlo on August 21, 1929. He was 42 and she was 22. Their mutual infidelities and his violent temper resulted in divorce in 1939, but they remarried December 8, 1940, in San Francisco, California.

A year after Kahlo's death, on July 29, 1955, Rivera married Emma Hurtado, his agent since 1946.

In his later years Rivera lived in the United States and Mexico. Rivera died on November 24, 1957, at the age of 70. He was buried at the Panteón de Dolores in Mexico City.

Personal beliefs
Rivera was an atheist. His mural Dreams of a Sunday in the Alameda depicted Ignacio Ramírez holding a sign that read, "God does not exist". This work caused a furor, but Rivera refused to remove the inscription. The painting was not shown for nine years – until Rivera agreed to remove the inscription. He stated: "To affirm 'God does not exist', I do not have to hide behind Don Ignacio Ramírez; I am an atheist and I consider religions to be a form of collective neurosis."

Art education and circle
From the age of ten, Rivera studied art at the Academy of San Carlos in Mexico City. He was sponsored to continue study in Europe by Teodoro A. Dehesa Méndez, the governor of the State of Veracruz. After arriving in Europe in 1907, Rivera first went to Madrid, Spain to study with Eduardo Chicharro.

From there he went to Paris, France, a destination for young European and American artists and writers, who settled in inexpensive flats in Montparnasse. His circle frequented La Ruche, where his Italian friend Amedeo Modigliani painted his portrait in 1914. His circle of close friends included Ilya Ehrenburg, Chaïm Soutine, Modigliani and his wife Jeanne Hébuterne, Max Jacob, gallery owner Léopold Zborowski, and Moise Kisling. Rivera's former lover Marie Vorobieff-Stebelska (Marevna) honored the circle in her painting Homage to Friends from Montparnasse (1962).

In those years, some prominent young painters were experimenting with an art form that would later be known as Cubism, a movement led by Pablo Picasso and Georges Braque. From 1913 to 1917, Rivera enthusiastically embraced this new style. Around 1917, inspired by Paul Cézanne's paintings, Rivera shifted toward Post-Impressionism, using simple forms and large patches of vivid colors. His paintings began to attract attention, and he was able to display them at several exhibitions.

Rivera claimed in his autobiography that, while in Mexico in 1904, he engaged in cannibalism, pooling his money with others to "purchase cadavers from the city morgue" and particularly "relish[ing] women's brains in vinaigrette". This claim has been considered factually suspect or an elaborate lie. He wrote in his autobiography: "I believe that when man evolves a civilization higher than the mechanized but still primitive one he has now, the eating of human flesh will be sanctioned. For then man will have thrown off all of his superstitions and irrational taboos."

Career in Mexico

In 1920, urged by Alberto J. Pani, the Mexican ambassador to France, Rivera left France and traveled through Italy studying its art, including Renaissance frescoes. After José Vasconcelos became Minister of Education, Rivera returned to Mexico in 1921 to become involved in the government sponsored Mexican mural program planned by Vasconcelos.  The program included such Mexican artists as José Clemente Orozco, David Alfaro Siqueiros, and Rufino Tamayo, and the French artist Jean Charlot. In January 1922, he painted – experimentally in encaustic – his first significant mural Creation in the Bolívar Auditorium of the National Preparatory School in Mexico City while guarding himself with a pistol against right-wing students.

In the autumn of 1922, Rivera participated in the founding of the Revolutionary Union of Technical Workers, Painters and Sculptors, and later that year he joined the Mexican Communist Party (including its Central Committee). His murals, subsequently painted in fresco only, dealt with Mexican society and reflected the country's 1910 Revolution. Rivera developed his own native style based on large, simplified figures and bold colors with an Aztec influence clearly present in murals at the Secretariat of Public Education in Mexico City begun in September 1922, intended to consist of one hundred and twenty-four frescoes, and finished in 1928.
Rivera's art work, in a fashion similar to the steles of the Maya, tells stories. The mural  (In the Arsenal) shows on the right-hand side Tina Modotti holding an ammunition belt and facing Julio Antonio Mella, in a light hat, and Vittorio Vidali behind in a black hat. However, the  detail shown does not include the right-hand side described nor any of the three individuals mentioned; instead it shows the left-hand side with Frida Kahlo handing out munitions. Leon Trotsky lived with Rivera and Kahlo for several months while exiled in Mexico. Some of Rivera's most famous murals are featured at the National School of Agriculture (Chapingo Autonomous University of Agriculture) at Chapingo near Texcoco (1925–1927), in the Cortés Palace in Cuernavaca (1929–30), and the National Palace in Mexico City (1929–30, 1935). 

Rivera painted murals in the main hall and corridor at the Chapingo Autonomous University of Agriculture (UACh). He also painted a fresco mural titled  (Fertile Land in English) in the university's chapel between 1923 and 1927. Fertile Land depicts the revolutionary struggles of Mexico's peasant (farmers) and working classes (industry) in part through the depiction of hammer and sickle joined by a star in the soffit of the chapel. In the mural, a "propagandist" points to another hammer and sickle. The mural features a woman with an ear of corn in each hand, which art critic Antonio Rodriguez describes as evocative of the Aztec goddess of maize in his book .

The corpses of revolutionary heroes Emiliano Zapata and Otilio Montano are shown in graves, their bodies fertilizing the maize field above. A sunflower in the center of the scene "glorifies those who died for an ideal and are reborn, transfigured, into the fertile cornfield of the nation", writes Rodrigues. The mural also depicts Rivera's wife Guadalupe Marin as a fertile nude goddess and their daughter Guadalupe Rivera y Marin as a cherub.

The mural was slightly damaged in an earthquake, but has since been repaired and touched up, remaining in pristine form.

Later years

In the autumn of 1927, Rivera went to Moscow, Soviet Union, having accepted a government invitation to take part in the celebration of the 10th anniversary of the October Revolution. The following year, while still in the Soviet Union, he met American Alfred H. Barr, Jr., who would soon become Rivera's friend and patron. Barr was the founding director of the Museum of Modern Art in New York City.

Although commissioned to paint a mural for the Red Army Club in Moscow, in 1928 Rivera was ordered by authorities to leave the country because, he suspected, of "resentment on the part of certain Soviet artists." He returned to Mexico.

In 1929, following the assassination of former president Álvaro Obregón the previous year, the government suppressed the Mexican Communist Party. That year Rivera was expelled from the party because of his suspected Trotskyite sympathies. In addition, observers noted that his 1928 mural In the Arsenal includes the figures of communists Tina Modotti, Cuban Julio Antonio Mella, and Italian Vittorio Vidali. After Mella was murdered in January 1929, allegedly by Stalinist assassin Vidali, Rivera was accused of having had advance knowledge of a planned attack.

After divorcing his third wife, Guadalupe (Lupe) Marin, Rivera married the much younger Frida Kahlo in August 1929. They had met when she was a student, and she was 22 years old when they married; Rivera was 42.

Also in 1929, American journalist Ernestine Evans's book The Frescoes of Diego Rivera, was published in New York City; it was the first English-language book on the artist. In December, Rivera accepted a commission from the American Ambassador to Mexico to paint murals in the Palace of Cortés in Cuernavaca, where the US had a consulate.

In September 1930, Rivera accepted a commission by architect Timothy L. Pflueger for two works related to his design projects in San Francisco. Rivera and Kahlo went to the city in November. Rivera painted a mural for the City Club of the San Francisco Stock Exchange for US$2,500. He also completed a fresco for the California School of Fine Art, a work that was later relocated to what is now the Diego Rivera Gallery at the San Francisco Art Institute.

During this period, Rivera and Kahlo worked and lived at the studio of Ralph Stackpole, who had recommended Rivera to Pflueger. Rivera met Helen Wills Moody, a notable American tennis player, who modeled for his City Club mural.

In November 1931, the Museum of Modern Art in New York City mounted a retrospective exhibition of Rivera's work; Kahlo attended with him.

Between 1932 and 1933, Rivera completed a major commission: twenty-seven fresco panels, entitled Detroit Industry, on the walls of an inner court at the Detroit Institute of Arts. Part of the cost was paid by Edsel Ford, scion of the entrepreneur.

During the McCarthyism of the 1950s, a large sign was placed in the courtyard defending the artistic merit of the murals while attacking his politics as "detestable."

His mural Man at the Crossroads, originally a three-paneled work, begun as a commission for John D. Rockefeller, Jr. in 1933 for the Rockefeller Center in New York City, was later destroyed. Because it included a portrait of Vladimir Lenin, former leader of the Soviet Union and Marxist pro-worker content, Rockefeller's son, the press, and some of the public protested, but the decision to destroy it was made by the management company. Anti-Communism ran high in some American circles, although many others in this period of the Great Depression had been drawn to the movement as offering hope to labor.

When Diego refused to remove Lenin from the painting, he was ordered to leave the US. One of Diego's assistants managed to take a few photographs of the work so Diego was able to later recreate it. American poet Archibald MacLeish wrote six "irony-laden" poems about the mural. The New Yorker magazine published E. B. White's light poem, "I paint what I see: A ballad of artistic integrity", also in response to the controversy with number of sponsors taking offense to it.As a result of the negative publicity, officials in Chicago cancelled their commission for Rivera to paint a mural for the Chicago World's Fair. Rivera issued a press statement, saying that he would use the remaining money from his commission at Rockefeller Center to repaint the same mural, over and over, wherever he was asked, until the money ran out. He had been paid in full although the mural was reportedly destroyed. There have been rumors that the mural was covered over rather than removed and destroyed, but this has not been confirmed.

In December 1933, Rivera returned to Mexico. He repainted Man at the Crossroads in 1934 in the Palacio de Bellas Artes in Mexico City, calling this version Man, Controller of the Universe.

On June 5, 1940, invited again by Pflueger, Rivera returned for the last time to the United States to paint a ten-panel mural for the Golden Gate International Exposition in San Francisco. His work, Pan American Unity was completed November 29, 1940. Rivera painted in front of attendees at the Exposition, which had already opened. He received US$1,000 per month and US$1,000 for travel expenses. The mural includes representations of two of Pflueger's architectural works, and portraits of Rivera's wife, Frida Kahlo, woodcarver Dudley C. Carter, and actress Paulette Goddard. She is shown holding Rivera's hand as they plant a white tree together. Rivera's assistants on the mural included Thelma Johnson Streat, a pioneer African-American artist, dancer, and textile designer. The mural and its archives are now held by City College of San Francisco.

In 1946-47, Rivera painted A Dream of a Sunday Afternoon in the Alameda Park, a fresco that featured a fully elaborated figure of La Calavera Catrina. This character, which was created by José Guadalupe Posada, originally consisted of a print depicting the head and shoulders of a skeletal woman in a big hat. Rivera endowed his Catrina figure with indigenous features and thus transformed her into a nationalist icon. Catrina is the most common image associated with Day of the Dead.

Membership in AMORC
In 1926, Rivera became a member of AMORC, the Ancient Mystical Order Rosae Crucis, an occult organization founded by American occultist Harvey Spencer Lewis. In 1926, Rivera was among the founders of AMORC's Mexico City lodge, called Quetzalcoatl after an ancient indigenous god. He painted an image of Quetzalcoatl for the local temple.

In 1954 Rivera tried to be readmitted into the Mexican Communist Party. He had been expelled in part because of his support of Trotsky, who had been exiled and assassinated years before in Mexico. Rivera was required to justify his AMORC activities. At the time, the Mexican Communist Party excluded persons involved in Freemasonry, and regarded AMORC as suspiciously similar to Freemasonry. Rivera told his questioners that, by joining AMORC, he wanted to infiltrate a typical “Yankee” organization on behalf of Communism. However, he also claimed that AMORC was “essentially materialist, insofar as it only admits different states of energy and matter, and is based on ancient Egyptian occult knowledge from Amenhotep IV and Nefertiti.”

Representation in other media
Diego Rivera has been portrayed in several films. He was played by Rubén Blades in Cradle Will Rock (1999), by Alfred Molina in Frida (2002), and (in a brief appearance) by José Montini in Eisenstein in Guanajuato (2015).

Barbara Kingsolver's novel, The Lacuna features Rivera, Kahlo, and Leon Trotsky as major characters.

Gallery

Paintings

Murals

Sculptures

See also

 Anahuacalli Museum
 Crystal Cubism
 Elaine Hamilton-O'Neal
 Gabriel Bracho, Venezuelan muralist
 Cárcamo de Dolores
 Glorious Victory painting of the 1954 Guatemalan coup d'état that the CIA backed to overthrow the democratically elected Guatemalan president Jacobo Arbenz. 
 List of works by Diego Rivera
 María Izquierdo

References

Further reading
 Aguilar, Louis. "Detroit was muse to legendary artists Diego Rivera and Frida Kahlo". The Detroit News. April 6, 2011.
Azuela, Alicia. Diego Rivera en Detroit. Mexico City: UNAM 1985.
Bloch, Lucienne. "On location with Diego Rivera." Art in America 74 (February 1986, pp. 102–23.
Craven, David. Diego Rivera as Epic Modernist. New York: G.K. Hall 1997.
Dickerman, Leah, and Anna Indych-López. Diego Rivera: Murals for the Museum of Modern Art. New York: The Museum of Modern Art 2011.
Downs, Linda. Diego Rivera: The Detroit Industry Murals. Detroit: The Detroit Institute of Arts 1999.
Evans, Robert [Joseph Freeman]. "Painting and Politics: The Case of Diego Rivera." New Masses (February 1932) 22-25.
González Mello, Renato. "Manuel Gamio, Diego Rivera and the Politics of Mexican Anthropology." RES 45 (Spring 2004) 161-85.
Lee, Anthony. Painting on the Left: Rivera, Radical Politics, and San Francisco's Public Murals. Berkeley and Los Angeles: University of California Press 1999.
Linsley, Robert. "Utopia Will Not be Televised: Rivera at Rockefeller Center." Oxford Art Journal 17, no. 2 (1994) 48-62.
Moyssén, Xavier, ed. Diego Rivera: Textos de arte. Mexico City: UNAM 1986.

Rivera, Diego. Arte y política, Raquel Tibol, ed. Mexico City Grijalbo 1979.
Rivera, Diego and Gladys March. My Life, Life: An Autobiography. New York: Dover Publications 1960.
Rodrigues, Antonio. "Canto a la tierra: Los murales de Diego Rivera en la Capilla de Chapingo." (trans. Allyson Cadwell) Texcoco: Universidad Autonoma Chapingo, 1986 (1st reprint, 2000).
Rochfort, Desmond. Mexican Muralists: Orozco, Rivera, Siqueiros, London: Laurence King, 1993.
Siqueiros, David Alfaro. "Rivera's Counter-Revolutionary Road." New Masses May 29, 1934.
Wolfe, Bertram. The Fabulous Life of Diego Rivera. New York: Stein and Day 1963.
Wolfe, Bertram and Diego Rivera. Portrait of Mexico. New York: Covici, Friede Publishers 1937.

External links

 Creation (1931). From the Collections of the Library of Congress
 Trials of the Hero-Twins (1931) From the Collections at the Library of Congress
 Human Sacrifice Before Tohil (1931) From the Collections at the Library of Congress
 Cubist paintings by Rivera
 
 

1886 births
1957 deaths
 
Académie Julian alumni
Artists from Mexico City
Cubist artists
Academic staff of Escuela Nacional de Pintura, Escultura y Grabado "La Esmeralda"
Frida Kahlo
Latin American artists of indigenous descent
Members of El Colegio Nacional (Mexico)
Mexican atheists
Mexican communists
Mexican muralists
Mexican people of indigenous peoples descent
Mexican people of Spanish-Jewish descent
Mexican people of Spanish descent
Mexican people of Portuguese descent
Mexican Trotskyists
Artists from Guanajuato
People from Cuernavaca
People from Guanajuato City
People from Morelos
Political artists
Social realist artists
Painters of the Return to Order
Federal Art Project artists
19th-century Mexican people
20th-century Mexican painters
20th-century male artists
Mexican male painters
Academy of San Carlos alumni